Keradere noctivaga is a species of snout moth. It is found on Cyprus and in Asia Minor.

The wingspan is 16–19 mm.

References

Moths described in 1879
Phycitini
Insects of Turkey